Joost M. Tinbergen (born 1950 in Groningen) is a Dutch ecologist.

Tinbergen is the son of the ornithologist Luuk Tinbergen, and nephew of Nobel Prize–winning brothers Jan and Niko Tinbergen. His older brother is the film-maker Tijs Tinbergen.

Tinbergen gained his PhD from the University of Groningen in 1980.  His thesis was 'Foraging decisions in Starlings'.  He has been professor since 1994.

External links 
 https://web.archive.org/web/20070316151727/http://www.rug.nl/biologie/onderzoek/onderzoekgroepen/dierOecologie/animalEcolmembers/tinbergenIntro

1950 births
Living people
University of Groningen alumni
Academic staff of the University of Groningen
Scientists from Groningen (city)